A link road is a transport infrastructure road that links two conurbations or other major road transport facilities, often added because of increasing road traffic. They can be controversial, especially if they threaten to destroy natural habitat and greenfield land.

The term is used in the United Kingdom, Australia, and the United States state of Nebraska.
An example of a link road is Marston Ferry Road in Oxford, England. It was built in the late 20th-century link North Oxford with Marston, Oxford to the east.

See also 
 Alternate route
 Bypass
 Beltway

References 

Roads in the United Kingdom
Roads in Australia
Types of roads